The NCAA Division I Men's Cross Country Championship is the cross country championship held by the National Collegiate Athletic Association each autumn for individual men's runners and cross country teams from universities in Division I. Teams and individual runners qualify for the championship at regional competitions approximately a week before the national championships.

Northern Arizona are the defending men's team champions.

History 
Each autumn since 1938, with the exception of 1943 and 2020, the National Collegiate Athletic Association has hosted men's cross country championships.  Since 1958, the NCAA has had multiple division championships.  Since 1973, Divisions I, II and III have all had their own national championships.

Qualifying 
Teams compete in one of nine regional championships to qualify, where the top two teams automatically advance and thirteen additional teams are chosen as at-large selections. In addition to the 31 teams, 38 individual runners qualify for the national championship.

History 
The field for the Division I national championship race has ranged in size from a low of 6 teams in 1938 to a high of 39 teams in 1970.  From 1982 to 1997 the field was fixed at 22 teams.  Beginning in 1998, the national championship race has included 31 teams.

Since 1976 the race distance has been .

Champions 
Prior to 1958, only a single national championship was held between all members of the NCAA; Division II started in 1958 and Division III in 1973.

A time highlighted in ██ indicates an NCAA championship record time for that distance at the time.
A † indicates the all-time NCAA championship record for that distance.
UTEP's 1983 championship was vacated by the NCAA Committee on Infractions.

Titles

Team titles
List updated through the 2022 Championships

Individual titles
List updated through the 2022 Championships.

Appearances
List updated through the 2019 Championships.

Most team appearances (top 15)

Records
Best Team Score: 17
UTEP (1981; Matthews Motshwarateu–1, Michael Musyoki–2, Gabriel Kaman–3, Suleiman Nyambui–5, Gidamis Shahanga–6)
Most Individual Titles: 3 (tie)
Gerry Lindgren, Washington State (1966, 1967, and 1969)
Steve Prefontaine, Oregon (1970, 1971, and 1973)
 Henry Rono, Washington State (1976, 1977, and 1979)
 Edward Cheserek, Oregon (2013, 2014, and 2015)
Best Individual Time, 4 miles: 19:21.3
Max Truex, USC (1957)
Best Individual Time, 6 miles: 28:00.2
Steve Prefontaine, Oregon (1970)
Best Individual Time, 10,000 meters: 28:06.6
Henry Rono, Washington State (1976)

See also
NCAA Men's Division I Outdoor Track and Field Championships
NCAA Men's Division II Cross Country Championship (from 1958)
NCAA Men's Division III Cross Country Championship (from 1973)
NCAA Women's Division I Cross Country Championship (from 1981)
NCAA Women's Division II Cross Country Championship (from 1981)
NCAA Women's Division III Cross Country Championship (from 1981)
Pre-NCAA Cross Country Champions
NAIA Cross Country Championships (Men, Women)

References

External links
NCAA Men's Cross Country

 Division I
Crosscountry
Men's athletics competitions